Keleri-Kefa (also Romanized as Keleri-Kefa) is a village in Larijan-e Sofla Rural District, Larijan District, Amol County, Mazandaran Province, Iran. At the 2006 census, its population was 38, in 10 families.

References

See also

Kefa (disambiguation)

Populated places in Amol County